Siegbert is the given name of:

Siegbert Horn (born 1950), former East German slalom canoer
Siegbert Hummel (1908−2001), Tibetologist and cultural historian
Siegbert Salomon Prawer (born 1925), professor of German language and literature
Siegbert Tarrasch (1862−1934), noted chess player and teacher
Siggi Wilzig (1926−2003), American businessman and Holocaust survivor
Siegbert Einstein
Siegbert Alber
Siegbert Rippe
Siegbert Droese
Siegbert Schmeisser
Siegbert Wirth

See also
Sigebert

Masculine given names